Thomas Arthur Tischinski (born July 12, 1944) is a retired American professional baseball player. A catcher, his career extended for 13 years (1962–1974) and included 82 games played in Major League Baseball (MLB) for the Minnesota Twins from 1969 to 1971.

Tischinski's three years as a backup catcher for Minnesota saw him play behind starters John Roseboro and George Mitterwald. The Twins won the American League West Division championship in each of his first two MLB seasons, but he did not appear in the postseason series that followed. In 137 plate appearances over his career, he collected 21 hits and 18 bases on balls. His lone big-league home run came on August 21, 1970, at Metropolitan Stadium off Casey Cox of the Washington Senators and provided the winning margin in a 4–3 Twin victory. He also hit two doubles and was credited with six runs batted in, batting .181 lifetime.

During his minor league career, he played in 888 games

References

External links
Baseball Reference

1944 births
Living people
Albuquerque Dukes players
Baseball players from Kansas City, Missouri
Buffalo Bisons (minor league) players
Charlotte Hornets (baseball) players
Daytona Beach Islanders players
Denver Bears players
Knoxville Smokies players
Macon Peaches players
Major League Baseball catchers
Minnesota Twins players
Rocky Mount Leafs players
San Diego Padres (minor league) players